Filo or Fillo may refer to the following people:

Given name
Filo Paulo (born 1987), New Zealand rugby player
Filo Tiatia (born 1971), New Zealand rugby player

Surname
David Filo (born 1966), American businessman, co-founder of Yahoo! 
John Filo (born 1948), American photographer
Frank Filo (born 1971), American football player
Martin Fillo (born 1986), Czech football player
Michal Filo (born 1984), Slovak football striker 
Stefania Filo Speziale (1905–1988), Italian architect
Tamás Filó (born 1979), Hungarian football player 
Vladimír Filo (1940–2015), Slovak Roman Catholic bishop
Xavier Su'a-Filo (born 1991), American football player
Yuval Filo (born 1998), Israeli rhythmic gymnast

Nickname
Filó (Filipe André Paula da Rocha, born 1972), Portuguese footballer and manager